Arnold House School is a preparatory school for boys in the St John's Wood district of Westminster, Greater London. It consists of a Junior School (Years 1-4) and Senior School (Years 5-8).

History
Arnold House School was founded in 1905 by Miss Hanson with nine pupils. Hanson opened the school with the intention of showing that a headmistress was equally capable of preparing boys for public schools. By the time she stepped down as Headmistress, the school was flourishing. It became a charitable trust in 1969.

Coat of Arms

In celebration of the school's centenary in 2005, it applied for and was granted a Coat of Arms by the College of Arms. It features the passage from which the school motto is derived:

Notable former pupils

 Jack Clayton, film director
 Giles Cooper, playwright and dramatist
 Freddie Fox, stage, film and television actor
 Roland Glasser, literary translator
 John Godley, 3rd Baron Kilbracken
 Hughie Green, television host
 Daniel Hahn, writer, editor and translator
 Lord Lucan 
 Michael McIntyre, comedian
 Jonathan Miller, theatre and opera director
 Jon Moss, drummer 
 Adam Raphael, journalist and author
 James Rhodes, pianist
 Jon Speelman, chess player
 David Say, former Bishop of Rochester
 David Watson, musician

Notable former staff
 Peter Galloway, former religious studies teacher

References

External links
School Website
Profile on the Independent Schools Council website
Profile on the Good Schools Guide

Church of England private schools in the Diocese of London
Private boys' schools in London
Private schools in the City of Westminster
Preparatory schools in London
Educational institutions established in 1905
1905 establishments in England
St John's Wood